Klaus Johannes Behrendt (born 7 February 1960 in Hamm, North Rhine-Westphalia) is a German actor. Since 1992 he has starred in the Westdeutscher Rundfunk version of the popular television crime series Tatort; he also stars in the 2008 film Die Bienen - Tödliche Bedrohung.

Life and education
Behrendt was born in Hamm, the son of a pediatrician, he grew up in Ibbenbüren in North Rhine-Westphalia, where he learned the profession of a mountain mechanic. After completing his civil service, he then took acting lessons from 1981 to 1984 at the Hamburg drama school stage studio with Hedi Höpfner (another actress) and then joined a festival engagement at the Theater Bremen. He performed there until 1988 in various works including Danton's Death (by Georg Büchner), The Seagull (Chekov), A Midsummer Night's Dream (Shakespeare) or Three Sisters (Chekov).

Career
Behrendt launched his television career in 1989, with a role in the television series Rote Erde as 'Jupp Kowalla'.

Behrendt gained great popularity from 1992 to 1994 and again since 1997 through his role as investigator Max Ballauf in the WDR crime series Tatort. He was initially as assistant to Commissar Flemming (Martin Lüttge) in Düsseldorf, later he was commissary leader with his colleague 'Freddy Schenk' (Dietmar Bär) in Cologne. In 1990, in the Tatort episode 234 (Schimanski's weapon) Behrendt had taken an supporting role as 'Erwin Spilonska'.

From 1995 to 1997, Behrendt appeared in the Sat.1 series  the leading role of private investigator 'Alexander Stein', in had 29 episodes. In the Sat.1 television movie production The Miracle of Lengede (or ), Behrendt was seen as a miner, his original profession. The film directed by Kaspar Heidelbach won a Grimme Award in 2004.

In the spring of 2005, Behrendt played the lead role in the ZDF television series Kanzleramt, as the fictional Chancellor Andreas Weyer. In 2007, he played in the ARD television drama Einfache Leute (Simple people) alongside Barbara Auer, as a family man hiding his homosexuality.

Behrendt is a member of the Bundesverband Schauspiel (Federal Association of Acting, BFFS).

Awards

For his acting work in Tatort (crime series), Behrendt was first awarded in 1998 with the Goldener Gong (magazine TV award) (for the episode Bildersturm). The same episode also received a nomination for the Adolf Grimme Prize. In October 2000, Klaus J. Behrendt and Dietmar Bär received for their roles in Tatort the German Television Award for Best Series Actor of 1999. Two other episodes of the Tatort were particularly distinguished; Odin's revenge (or Odins Rache) in 2004 was for the German Television Award and 2004 European Civis Media Award. Then in 2007 episode Mine Game was nominated for the Marler Media Prize Human Rights award (by the German section of Amnesty International). In 2011, he with the castmates Jan Josef Liefers, Axel Prahl and Dietmar Bär received a 1Live crown (German music award).

For his performance in a television film (directed by Andreas Kleinert) Mein Vater (Coming Home) alongside Götz George, Behrendt received the 'Audience Award of the Marl Group' at the Adolf Grimme Prize and the Bavarian Television Award in 2003. In addition, the film was awarded the International Emmy Award for best TV movie.

Since 2005, Behrendt is the bearer of the 'Honorary Brand' of the Bund Deutscher Kriminalbeamter (the League of German Detective or German Criminal Investigation Association). In 2009, he received a nomination for the Golden Camera as Best Actor. Then in 2015, Klaus J. Behrendt and Dietmar Bär were awarded the Order of Merit of North Rhine-Westphalia for their social commitment. In 2018, Klaus J. Behrendt and Dietmar Bär were awarded the Rhineland Valley of the LVR for their services to the cultural development and significance of the Rhineland.

Personal life
Behrendt has two sons and a daughter from his first marriage, and lives with his second wife Karin and her son from a previous relationship in Berlin-Charlottenburg. His son Tom was in 2016 a German national team rugby player and played with FC St. Pauli Rugby.

Partial filmography

1986: Großstadtrevier (TV Series)
1988: Ein Treffen mit Rimbaud - Thomas
1989–1993: Schulz & Schulz (TV Series) - Seibt
1990-2019: Tatort (TV Series) - Max Ballauf / Erwin Spilonska
1991-2010: Ein Fall für zwei (TV Series) - Dr. Fritsch / Martin Sutter / Klaus Hencke / Walter Schultheis
1992: Elenya - Franz
1993:  (TV Movie) - Tom Konnitz
1993: Leo und Charlotte (TV Movie) - Leo
1995–1998:  (TV Series) - Alexander Stein
1996:  (TV Movie) - Jonny
1996: Die Spur der roten Fässer - Wirt
1997: Ein Vater unter Verdacht (TV Movie) - Roman Bach
1998: Ferkel Fritz (TV Movie) - Martin
1998: Kai Rabe gegen die Vatikankiller - Bernd Krüger
1999: Verratene Freundschaft – Ein Mann wird zur Gefahr (TV Movie) - Ulf Danner
2003: Mein Vater (TV Movie) - Jochen Esser
2003:  (TV Movie) - Pit Spieker
2004: Die Stunde der Offiziere (TV Movie documentary) - Oberst von Gersdorff
2005: Kanzleramt (TV Series) - Bundeskanzler Andreas Weyer
2005: Das Gespenst von Canterville (TV Movie) - Jochen Brenner
2006:  (TV Movie) - Boatswain Acki Lüders
2007: Einfache Leute (TV Movie) - Bademeister Henrik Bode
2007:  (TV Movie) - Horst Strasser
2007: Jakobs Bruder - Jakob Goldt
2008: Guter Junge (TV Movie) - Achim Maas
2008: Die Bienen – Tödliche Bedrohung (TV Movie) - Hans Bergmann
2009: Fünf Tage Vollmond (TV Movie) - Anton Brunner
2010: Ungesühnt (TV Movie) - Lukas Dorwald
2010: Wie ein Licht in der Nacht (TV Movie) - Horst Keller
2011: World Express – Atemlos durch Mexiko (TV Movie) - Franz Joseph Anson
2011: Isenhart – Die Jagd nach dem Seelenfänger (TV Movie) - Sydal von Friedberg
2012: Jahr des Drachen (TV Movie) - Thomas Eichner
2012: Rommel (TV Movie) - General Guderian
2012: Der Staatsanwalt (TV Series) - Karsten Wippermann / Robert Limmer
2015: Letzte Spur Berlin (TV Series) - Christian Wagner
2016: Liebe am Fjord (TV Series) - Henrik Jacobsen

References

External links
Interview with Klaus J. Behrendt and Dietmar Bär

1960 births
Living people
People from Hamm
German male television actors
German male film actors
20th-century German male actors
21st-century German male actors